Lyman Stewart (July 22, 1840 – September 28, 1923) was a U.S. businessman and co-founder of Union Oil Company of California, which eventually became Unocal. Stewart was also a significant Christian philanthropist and cofounder of the Bible Institute of Los Angeles (now known as Biola University).  He and his brother Milton also anonymously funded publication of The Fundamentals, the foundation document of Christian fundamentalism. Stewart also helped found the Union Rescue Mission in Los Angeles.

Early life
Stewart was born in 1840 in northwestern Pennsylvania, and worked for his father who was a tanner. When Edwin Drake discovered oil near Titusville, Pennsylvania in 1859, Stewart tried drilling wells in the same area. After two disastrous attempts, he served a three-year enlistment in the 16th Pennsylvania Cavalry during the American Civil War.

Oil career
After the war, Stewart again tried to drill for oil, but he was still unsuccessful. In 1877, Stewart was introduced to Wallace Hardison (a relative of one of his friends). Hardison agreed to financially support Stewart, so they purchased some land where they hoped to find oil. They enjoyed some moderate success. When John D. Rockefeller started to consolidate oil holdings in the eastern U.S., Hardison and Stewart sold their interests to Standard Oil and moved to California.

Stewart and his partner found the success they sought in California. By 1886, the Hardison and Stewart Oil Company was responsible for 15% of all oil production in California. In 1890, they merged their interests with those of Thomas Bard and Paul Calonico to form the Union Oil Company. As president of Union Oil, Stewart heavily invested in new wells and expanded his company's market capitalization from $10 million in 1900 to over $50 million in 1908.

Philanthropy
Stewart founded the Pacific Gospel Mission (now the Union Rescue Mission) in 1891. In 1908, Stewart, along with noted Christian author T.C. Horton, founded the Bible Institute of Los Angeles (now known as Biola University).

In 1917, he donated $4,500 to fund construction of Stewart Hall at Toccoa Falls College.

References

External links 
 Harvard Business School 20th Century American Leaders database
 "Whiskey and Gunpowder" article featuring biographical information about Lyman Stewart

American businesspeople in the oil industry
Businesspeople from California
Founders of the petroleum industry
Union Oil Company of California
1840 births
1923 deaths
Biola University
American Christians
19th-century American businesspeople